Xawery is a Polish given name version of name Xavier, other variation is Ksawery, may refer to:

Xawery Czernicki (1882–1940), Polish engineer, military commander and one of the highest-ranking officers of the Polish Navy
Xawery Dunikowski (1875–1964), Polish sculptor and artist, Auschwitz concentration camp survivor
Xawery Stańczyk (born 1985), Polish poet, sociologist and essayist
Xawery Wolski (born 1960), Polish-Mexican artist and sculptor
Xawery Żuławski (born 1971), Polish film director
Franciszek Xawery Drucki-Lubecki (1778–1846), Polish politician, freemason and diplomat

See also
ORP Kontradmirał Xawery Czernicki, multitask logistic support ship of the Polish Navy
Ksawery

masculine given names
Polish masculine given names